The Lithuanian Territorial Defense Force or LTDF (LVR) was a short-lived, Lithuanian, volunteer armed force created and disbanded in 1944 during the German occupation of Lithuania. LTDF was subordinate to the authorities of Nazi Germany. Its goal was to fight the approaching Red Army, provide security and conduct Nazi security warfare within the territory, claimed by Lithuanians (see also Nazi German occupation of Lithuania, Generalbezirk Litauen of Reichskommissariat Ostland). LTDF had some autonomy and was staffed by Lithuanian officers, their most notable commander being Lithuanian General Povilas Plechavičius. LTDF quickly reached the size of about 10,000 men. After brief engagements against the Soviet and Polish partisans (Armia Krajowa), the force self-disbanded, its leaders were arrested and sent to concentration camps, and numerous of its members were executed by the Nazis. Many others were either drafted into other Nazi auxiliary services or started forming an armed anti-Soviet resistance, also known as Forest Brothers. The Union of Soldiers of the Lithuanian Territorial Defense Force (Lietuvos vietinės rinktinės karių sąjunga), a veterans organization, was founded in 1997.

Earlier mobilisation attempts
In early 1943, Nazi occupational government attempted to raise a Waffen-SS division from the local population as they had in many other countries, but the mobilization was boycotted by the Lithuanians with less than 300 men reporting. The Nazis carried out reprisals against the population and deported 46 prominent figures and members of the intelligentsia to the Stutthof concentration camp. All Lithuanian higher education institutions were closed by the Nazis on March 18–19. In summer 1943, an "All Lithuanian Conference", sponsored by the Nazi authorities, allowed for a more successful mobilization campaign. This resulted in the creation of an armed force, that would only act in the territory claimed by Lithuania and would be commanded only by Lithuanian officers.

Creation
After the Germans suffered losses in the Eastern Front and the Red Army was approaching, Lithuanian General Povilas Plechavičius used the opportunity and continued the negotiations with the Germans. The Nazis finally agreed to create units of Vietinė rinktinė. The soldiers would wear Lithuanian insignia on their uniforms. Most of his demands were not met, notably a request to transfer officers from police battalions. German Zivilverwaltung agreed not to transfer Lithuanian youth to German labor camps while LTDF was active. At first the plans called for 21 battalions, 250-strong each. Later by Plechavičius' demands the quota was increased to 10,000 men.

All the Lithuanian political underground organizations supported formation of LTDF. The formal agreement was signed on February 13, 1944 and on February 16, 1944, the Lithuanian Independence Day, Plechavičius made a radio appeal to the nation for volunteers. The appeal was very successful and estimates put the number of volunteers between 20,000 and 30,000. Eventually the LTDF had a peak strength of about 10,000 men, assigned to 14 battalions. Thirteen battalions were fully formed with 750 men each and the 14th battalion was an officers training battalion in Marijampolė. In Nazi manner they were numbered as police battalions 301–310 and 312–314.

The process of creation was not smooth because Germans did not trust the LTDF. They ordered reorganization of already formed battalions of four companies into battalions of three companies, and were constantly delaying delivery of arms, munitions, means of transportation and communication. Because SS did not trust the Lithuanian officers, they demanded that German officers, called Zahlmeisters, would be inserted into LTDF units. An oath, similar to one used by the Lithuanian armed forces, was prepared. The oath was altered by SS and Police Leader Hermann Harm to include a personal oath to Hitler. Knowing that such an oath was not acceptable to soldiers of LTDF, the ceremony was delayed every time and the oath was not taken until the formation self-disbanded.

Dissent 
The Germans were surprised by the number of volunteers as their previous appeals went unheeded. Possibly perceiving the growing popularity of the unit as a threat, they started to interfere, going against the signed agreement. On March 22, 1944, SS Obergruppenführer and SD General Friedrich Jeckeln called for 70–80 thousand subsidiary assistants for the German army. Chief-of-Staff of the Northern Front Field Marshal Walther Model further demanded that the Lithuanians provide personnel for 15 security battalions for the military airports. General Commissioner of Lithuania Adrian von Renteln added his demand for laborers to be sent to work in Germany. They were not the only German officials to issue demands for Lithuanian recruits. Plechavičius rejected and resisted such demands.

On April 6, 1944, Plechavičius was given an order to mobilize the entire country. He refused, saying that it is impossible until the formation of his existing detachment was finished; this increased the Germans displeasure with him. In late April, as the German plans to mobilize Lithuanians into the German armed forces became obvious, Plechavičius secretly started organizing Tėvynės Apsaugos Rinktinė, an underground armed forces, which would include Lithuanian Army officers, veterans of the Lithuanian Wars of Independence, and former members of Lithuanian Riflemen Union. All across Lithuania, a network was secretly organized by territorial LTDF officers. The plans were to assemble around 75–80 thousand men. Most of the organizational structure was laid, and it served as a basis for the armed anti-Soviet resistance.

Activities
The mission of the LTDF was to defend the country against the approaching Soviet Red Army. Since the Red Army had not entered the Lithuanian lands to which LTDF was confined, the force was used instead to aid the Nazis in their operations against Soviet and Polish partisans operating in the Lithuanian territory. In April, the Polish Armia Krajowa (AK) in the Vilnius Region attempted to begin negotiations with Plechavičius, proposing a non-aggression pact and cooperation against the Nazi Germany. The Lithuanian side refused and demanded that the Poles either abandon the Vilnius Region (disputed between Poles and Lithuanians) or subordinate themselves to the Lithuanians in their struggle against the Soviets.

In early May, the LTDF initiated a widespread anti-partisan operation against the Polish and Soviet partisans in the area. Seven battalions were dispatched to man the garrisons in and around the towns of Oszmiana (modern Ašmiany) and Holszany (modern Halšany), notably the villages of Murowana Oszmianka (Muravanaya Ashmyanka) and Graużyszki (Graužiškės, Граўжышкі), Tołminowo (Талмінава, Гродзінскі сельсавет) and Nowosiółki (Навасёлкі). LTDF units committed atrocities against Polish civilians, notably in Pawłów (Merkinė village in Šalčininkai District), Graużyszki and Sienkowszczyzna (Сенкаўшчына, Кальчунскі сельсавет).

However, the Polish resistance fought back. On May 4, the 3rd Brigade of AK intercepted and destroyed a company of the Lithuanian 310th Battalion which attempted to pacify the Polish village of Pawłowo. At Graużyszki, the Lithuanian 301st Battalion suffered 47 casualties, and on May 5 was dispersed by the 8th and 12th Brigades of the Armia Krajowa. On May 6, the 8th, 9th and 13th Brigades of AK defeated two companies of the Lithuanian 308th Battalion, which were burning the villages of Sienkowszczyzna and Adamkowszyczyzna and murdering their inhabitants. Most notably, the Polish resistance organized a concentrated assault against the fortified Lithuanian positions around the village of Murowana Oszmianka. The defenses, reinforced with concrete bunkers and trenches, were manned by the 301st Battalion of the LTDF. During the night of May 13–14, the 3rd Brigade of the AK assaulted the village from the west and north-west, while the 8th and 12th Brigades attacked from the south and east. The remainder of the Polish forces (13th and 9th Brigades) secured the Murowana Oszmianka – Tołminowo road. During the battle, the Lithuanian force lost 60 men, while 170 were taken prisoner of war. Another 117 Lithuanian soldiers were taken prisoner later that night in the nearby village of Tołminowo. After the battle all Lithuanian prisoners were disarmed and set free with only their long johns and helmets on. The Poles used the element of surprise because the Lithuanians had around 150 more soldiers. The disparity in size, and the fact that Lithuanians no longer felt safe inside their own barracks, only added to the importance of the defeat.

The weapons and uniforms taken from the Lithuanians significantly improved the equipment of the Polish forces. As a result, Lithuanian forces completely withdrew from the area hiding in Vilnius or retreating to the area of pre-war Lithuania.

Liquidation
Since March Germans constantly attempted to use LTDF to mobilize Lithuanians for labor in Germany, Wehrmacht, and Hilfswillige, but such attempts were blocked by Plechavičius. As tensions between Germans and LTDF were growing, Plechavičius even sent a resignation request and suggested to demobilise LTDF on April 12. Demands and tension continued to grow. At the end of April, Plechavičius secretly blocked creation of a list of conscripts into the German army. He opposed the mobilization, announced at the beginning of May (it was supposed to be completed on May 8). The mobilization failed completely, when only 3–5% of men of conscription age reported to the German authorities. Most of them were not fit for the military service. Plechavičius had personally ordered his officers in territorial branches to ignore the mobilization order.

Since April the Germans were considering transforming LTDF into an auxiliary police service of the SS. On May 9, 1944, after the unsuccessful attempt of mobilisation, Friedrich Jeckeln ordered the detachment units in the Vilnius Region to recognize his direct authority. All other units of LTDF were to become subordinates of the regional German commanders. Jeckeln demanded the troops to take an oath to Hitler. Furthermore, the detachment was to wear SS uniforms and use the Heil Hitler greeting.

Upon hearing this order, and being informed that it was signed by Jeckeln as early as April 15, Plechavičius opposed this challenge to his authority and rejected the demands. On May 9, he immediately ordered cadets, training in Marijampolė, to return home. He also ordered LTDF battalions in the Vilnius Region to stop hostilities with AK forces and return to the assigned garrisons. Plechavičius issued a declaration for his men to disband and disappear into the forests with their weapons and uniforms. The Lithuanian headquarters directed the detachment units in the field to obey only the orders of the Lithuanian chain of command. On May 12, Plechavičius refused to meet with newly appointed Kurt Hintze and sent his chief of staff Urbonas, who told Hintze that Plechavičius never meant to be an SS officer, nor ever wanted to serve in this structure. Jeckeln also suggested that LTDF would fight in the Western Front, but Plechavičius refused. The failures of the operation against the Polish Armia Krajowa resistance, culminating in the LTDF defeat in the Battle of Murowana Oszmianka on May 13–14, gave the Germans another excuse to assert their control over the formation.

Persecutions
Plechavičius and his chief of staff Colonel Oskaras Urbonas, were arrested on May 15. Jeckeln and Hintze delivered a speech before the remaining LTDF officers accusing them of banditry, sabotage, and political agenda and threatening them with executions and transfers to concentration camps. Jeckeln announced that LTDF was to be disbanded and disarmed. Soldiers of the LTDF would be transferred to German air defence forces. Anyone who would desert would be shot on sight, causing repressions against their families. Together with other members of the LTDF staff Plechavičius was deported to the Salaspils concentration camp in Latvia. Altogether, 52 LTDF officers ended up in Salaspils, 106 cadets in Stutthof, and 983 soldiers in Oldenburg concentration camps. To make an example, the Nazis shot about 100 former LTDF members, and publicly executed 12 randomly selected soldiers in a Vilnius line-up which consisted of some 800 men. 84 or 86 members of LTDF were shot in Paneriai. While transporting some of the arrested men to Kaunas, one of the prisoners escaped. In retaliation, the Germans then selected NCO Ruseckas for execution on the spot. Since the German regular army guards were stalling the execution, an SS officer did the actual shooting.

Most of the soldiers were to be disarmed and arrested by the Germans, but they succeeded disarming only 4 out of 14 battalions. On May 16 German units arrived to liquidate Marijampolė officers school, but found only a dozen soldiers; after an attempt to disarm them a firefight started and 4 or 5 soldiers were killed. About 3,500 members of the LTDF were by force drafted into other Nazi formations: several infantry battalions under Colonel Birontas were sent to the Eastern Front, some became guards at Luftwaffe installations outside Lithuania, others were sent to Germany as forced laborers. Many soldiers who managed to evade the Germans, disappeared with their weapons. They formed the core of the armed anti-Soviet resistance, which waged a guerrilla war for the next eight years. Covert Soviet plans for the destruction of the remnants of Plechavičius' army were already created in 1944 and the Soviets would execute or imprison LTDF soldiers they captured. LTDF was the last large mobilization attempt by the Nazis.

See also
Lithuanian collaboration during World War II

Notes
a  Vietinė rinktinė has several translations into English, which can cause some confusion. Translations include: Territorial Defense Force, Home Army, Home Defense, Local Defense, Local Lithuanian Detachment, Lithuanian Home Formation, etc. Litauische Sonderverbände means Lithuanian Special Group.

References

Bibliography

Generalbezirk Litauen
Military history of Lithuania during World War II
Military history of Germany during World War II
Military units and formations established in 1944
Paramilitary organizations based in Lithuania